Mariano Peralta Bauer (born 20 February 1998) is an Argentine professional footballer who plays as a forward for Unión de Santa Fe, on loan from San Lorenzo.

Professional career
On 11 September 2018, Peralta Bauer signed his first professional contract with San Lorenzo. He made his professional debut with San Lorenzo in a 3-1 Argentine Primera División win over Aldosivi on 1 March 2020. On 15 February 2022, Peralta Bauer joined Unión de Santa Fe on a loan deal until the end of 2022 with a purchase option in June for US$700,000 and in December for US$900,000.

References

External links
 
 San Lorenzo Profile

1998 births
Living people
People from Adrogué
Argentine footballers
Association football forwards
San Lorenzo de Almagro footballers
Unión de Santa Fe footballers
Argentine Primera División players
Sportspeople from Buenos Aires Province
Argentine people of German descent